Niharika Dash is an Indian actress and model. She made her debut with the Odia film Tu Kahibu Na Mu. She is the winner of 2nd season of Kie Heba Mo Heroine by Tarang TV. She was last seen in the show Kalijai on Tarang Tv, in the titular role.

References

External links
 https://www.odiaweb.in/kie-heba-mo-heroine-season-3/ Kie Heba Mo Heroine Season 3
 

Year of birth missing (living people)
Living people
Indian film actresses
Indian television actresses
Actresses in Odia cinema
Actresses in Odia television
Female models from Odisha
21st-century Indian actresses